Green ubatuba (Port. verde ubatuba) is the commercial name of a Brazilian charnockite, although it is often sold as a granite. It comes from the Ubatuba area of Brazil, where it forms part of the Neoproterozoic Ribeira Belt. As its name indicates, it is green in color, dark green and almost a black appearance when seen in low light. It contains large (10 cm) phenocrysts of alkali feldspar. It is widely used in home renovations and landscaping.

References

Stone (material)
Granitic rocks
Geology of Brazil
Ubatuba